The 2000 Golden Globes (Portugal) were held at the Coliseu dos Recreios, Lisbon on 2 April 2000.

Winners
Cinema:
Best Film: Jaime, with António Pedro Vasconcelos
Best Director: António Pedro Vasconcelos, in Jaime
Best Actress: Ana Bustorff, in Inferno
Best Actor: Vítor Norte, in A Sombra dos Abutres, and Jaime

Sports:
Personality of the Year : Luís Figo

Theatre:
Personality of the Year : Luís Miguel Cintra

Music:
Best Performer: Sara Tavares
Best Group: Ala dos Namorados
Best Song: Solta-se o beijo - Ala dos Namorados

Television:
Best Information Host: José Alberto Carvalho
Best Entertainment Host: Bárbara Guimarães
Best Fiction and Comedy Show: Médico de Família
Best Entertainment Show: Chuva de Estrelas
Best Information Program: Esta Semana

Radio:
Personality of the Year – António Sérgio
Best Station - TSF

Career Award:
Casa do Artista (Armando Cortez and Raul Solnado)

References

1999 film awards
1999 music awards
1999 television awards
Golden Globes (Portugal)
2000 in Portugal